Acıkuyu is a neighbourhood in Şereflikoçhisar, Ankara, Turkey. It used to be considered a village before 2013 Turkish local government reorganisation.

Demographics

References 

Şereflikoçhisar
Populated places in Ankara Province